The Mirchi Music Award for Upcoming Lyricist of The Year is given yearly by Radio Mirchi as a part of its annual Mirchi Music Awards for Hindi films, to recognise an upcoming lyricist for contributing in a film song. The award ceremony was started in 2008 to honour the best of Hindi film music. Ashok Mishra was the winner in that award ceremony for the film Welcome to Sajjanpur. As of the 2018 ceremony, Prateek Kuhad is the most recent winner in this category for the song "Kadam" from the film Karwaan.

Winners and nominees 
In the following table, the years are listed as per presenter's convention, and generally correspond to the year of film release in India. The ceremonies are always held the following year.

2000s

2010s

See also
 Mirchi Music Awards
 Bollywood
 Cinema of India

References

External links 
 Music Mirchi Awards Official Website

Mirchi Music Awards
Indian music awards
2008 establishments in Maharashtra